The Voice of the Heart may refer to:

 The Voice of the Heart (1924 film), a German silent drama film
 The Voice of the Heart (1937 film), a German drama film
 Voice of the Heart, a 1983 album by Carpenters